Roger E. Kirk (born February 23, 1930) is a professor of psychology and statistics at Baylor University. He earned his B.A., M.A., and Ph.D. from Ohio State University. Before joining the faculty of Psychology and Neuroscience at Baylor University he was the Senior Psychoacoustical Engineer at the Baldwin Piano and Organ Company in Cincinnati, Ohio. Professor Kirk is a fellow of the American Psychological Association, the American Psychological Society, and the American Educational Research Association.

Kirk has written five books. His first book, Experimental Design: Procedures for the Behavioral Sciences, now in a fourth edition, was designated a Citation Classic by the Institute for Scientific Information. His introductory statistics book is in a fifth edition. He and his wife are also avid ballroom dancers and he frequently uses the stairs to get to his 3rd story office.

References

1930 births
Living people
People from Ohio
21st-century American psychologists
Educational psychologists
Ohio State University alumni
Fellows of the American Psychological Association
20th-century American psychologists